Europatitan (meaning "European giant") is a genus of somphospondylan sauropod from the Early Cretaceous Castrillo de la Reina Formation of Iberia, known from a relatively completely specimen discovered in the early 2000s. It contains a single species, E. eastwoodi, named after actor and director Clint Eastwood.

The holotype discovered at "El Oterillo II" in the Castrillo de la Reina Formation (Urbión Group) in 2003.

See also
2017 in archosaur paleontology

References

Sauropods
Early Cretaceous dinosaurs of Europe
Fossil taxa described in 2017